Samuel Vestal (November 16, 1844 – January 9, 1928) was an American politician in the state of Washington. He served in the Washington State Senate from 1889 to 1893.

References

1844 births
1928 deaths
Republican Party Washington (state) state senators